CKDQ (Real Country 910) is a radio station in Drumheller, Alberta. Owned by Stingray Group, it broadcasts a country format. CKDQ is the only station in Canada which broadcasts on 910 AM, a Regional broadcast frequency.

History 
The station began broadcasting in 1958 as CJDV, until it changed to its current call sign in 1981. It is a Class B station broadcasting with a power of 50,000 watts, and using a two tower directional antenna daytime and a four tower directional antenna nighttime. The former CJDV callsign now belongs to a radio station in Cambridge, Ontario.

In 2016, the station became a semi-satellite of Camrose/Edmonton sister station CFCW, rebranding from Q91 to 910 CFCW; it carried a mix of CFCW and local programming. In October 2018, CKDQ rebranded as Real Country 910 (adopting a brand used by other Newcap-owned country stations in Alberta).

References

External links
 
 

Kdq
Kdq
Kdq
Drumheller
Radio stations established in 1958
1958 establishments in Alberta